James H. Washington (May 1850 - December 23, 1916) was a school principal and state legislator in Texas.

Washington was born in Fredericksburg, Virginia. He graduated from school at Oberlin College in Oberlin, Ohio (Oberlin Academy), and moved to Washington, D.C with his family. He moved to Texas in the early 1870s, settling in Navasota where was the principal at a city school for African Americans.

He represented Grimes County in the Texas House of Representatives during the Thirteenth Texas  Legislature. He served from 1873 to 1874, taking office after his contested elextion was resolved

He was a Republican who attended state party conventions in 1872, 1873, 1884, 1888, and 1890. He was part of the Colored Men's Convention of 1873.

Washington served in the Thirteenth Legislature in Texas as a representative of Grimes County, Texas. He married Mary F. Campbell in 1873 and they had one daughter. She was the daughter of Baptist missionary Israel S. Campbell. Washington moved to Galveston in 1874 and served on the city council, as an alderman from the Eighth Ward, and was an inspector of customs.

See also
African-American officeholders during and following the Reconstruction era

References

1850 births
1916 deaths
Politicians from Fredericksburg, Virginia
Oberlin College alumni
People from Navasota, Texas
African-American state legislators in Texas
African-American politicians during the Reconstruction Era
People from Galveston, Texas
Schoolteachers from Texas
19th-century American educators
African-American schoolteachers
American school principals
Texas city council members
19th-century American politicians